Miss Universe 1957, the 6th Miss Universe pageant, was held on 19 July 1957 in Long Beach, California, United States. In this pageant, 32 contestants competed. Gladys Zender of Peru won the competition, becoming the first Latin American woman to be crowned as Miss Universe, and was crowned by Carol Morris of the United States.

Results

Placements

Contestants

  Alaska - Martha Lehmann
  - Mónica Lamas
  - Hannerl Melcher
  - Janine Hanotiau
  - Terezinha Morango †
  - Gloria Noakes
  - Camellia Rosalia Perera
  - Sonia Cristina Icaza
  - María Rosa Gamio Fernández
  - Patricia Juliana Benítez Wright
  - Sonia Hamilton
  - Lisa Simon
  - Gerti Daub
  - Ligia Karavia
  - Ana Walda Olyslager
  Hawaii - Ramona Tong
  - Bryndís Schram
  - Atara Barzely
  - Valeria Fabrizi
  - Kyoko Otani †
  - Park Hyun-ok
  - Ginette Cidalise-Montaise
  - Irma Arévalo
  - Jacqueline Dorella Bonilla
  - Lucy Montanero Rivarola
  - Gladys Zender
  - Mary Ann Carmen Philipps Corrales
  - Mapita Mercado Cordero
  - Inger Jonsson
  - Guler Sirmen
  - Gabriela Pascal
  - Consuelo Nouel Gómez †

Notes

Debuts

Withdrawals
  - June Finlayson
 
 
 
  - Marita Lindahl (Miss World 1957)
  - Corine Rottschäfer (Miss Europe 1957) was ineligible to compete due to winning another international pageant. She was allowed to compete at Miss Universe the following year.
  - Mary Leona Gage (see Miss USA disqualified)

Did not Compete
  - Yolanda Pulecio Vélez

Returns
Last competed in 1953
 
 
Last competed in 1955

Awards
  - Miss Friendship (Mapita Mercado Cordero)
  - Miss Photogenic (Gerti Daub)
  Canada - Most Popular Girl (Gloria Noakes)

Miss USA Disqualified
Miss USA, Leona Gage (MD), was announced as a semi-finalist, but she was ejected from the pageant the afternoon before the final after it was discovered that she was married and the mother of two young children. Miss Argentina, Mónica Lamas, who had placed 16th in the preliminary, took over the spot vacated by Gage. 

Gage was also stripped of her title and was replaced by Charlotte Sheffield (UT), but Sheffield was unable to compete because the preliminary competition had already taken place, thus marking the first (and as of 2023 only) time that a Miss USA did not compete at Miss Universe. Sheffield competed at Miss World 1957, but was unplaced.

References

1957
1957 beauty pageants
Beauty pageants in the United States
1957 in California
July 1957 events in the United States